Andreyevka is a rural locality (a selo) in Pervomaysky Selsoviet, Derbentsky District, Republic of Dagestan, Russia. The population was 326 as of 2010. The village has an Azerbaijani-majority. There are 8 streets.

Geography 
Andreyevka is located 20 km northwest of Derbent (the district's administrative centre) by road. Imeni Michurina and Yuny Pakhar are the nearest rural localities.

References 

Rural localities in Derbentsky District